El derecho de nacer is a Mexican telenovela produced by Televisa for Telesistema Mexicano in 1966.

Cast 
María Rivas
Eusebia Cosme
Enrique Rambal
Anita Blanch

References

External links 

Mexican telenovelas
1966 telenovelas
Televisa telenovelas
Spanish-language telenovelas
1966 Mexican television series debuts
1966 Mexican television series endings